Johnson City is a village in Broome County, New York, United States. The population was 15,174 at the 2010 census. It is part of the Binghamton Metropolitan Statistical Area.

The village of Johnson City is in the town of Union and is a part of the "Triple Cities" along with Endicott and Binghamton. Johnson City lies to the west of Binghamton on the eastern side of the town of Union.

History 

Known as the "Home of the Square Deal", from the Square Deal given to all employees of Endicott Johnson Corporation, Johnson City was originally incorporated in 1892 as the village of Lestershire. In 1916, the village was renamed Johnson City in honor of George F. Johnson, who led the company that was by then known as Endicott Johnson.

2009 dissolution vote
In January 2007, a group of residents organized a petition supporting dissolution of the village for tax reasons. A vote was held on November 3, 2009. On November 12, 2009, the results came back "no" for dissolution by just 42 votes.

Geography

Johnson City is on the north side of the Susquehanna River.

The junction of New York State Route 17 and New York State Route 201, which connects the community to the south side of the Susquehanna River, is in Johnson City. New York State Route 17C parallels NY-17.

Demographics

As of the census of 2000, there were 15,535 people, 6,981 households, and 3,651 families residing in the village. The racial makeup of the village was 88.86% White, 3.09% African American, 0.19% Native American, 4.93% Asian, 0.05% Pacific Islander, 0.84% from other races, and 2.03% from two or more races. Hispanic or Latino of any race were 2.23% of the population.

There were 6,981 households, out of which 22.6% had children under the age of 18 living with them, 37.1% were married couples living together, 12.0% had a female householder with no husband present, and 47.7% were non-families. 40.3% of all households were made up of individuals, and 16.5% had someone living alone who was 65 years of age or older. The average household size was 2.12 and the average family size was 2.88.

In the village, the population was spread out, with 20.0% under the age of 18, 11.0% from 18 to 24, 27.2% from 25 to 44, 20.2% from 45 to 64, and 21.6% who were 65 years of age or older. The median age was 39 years. For every 100 females, there were 85.8 males. For every 100 females age 18 and over, there were 83.0 males.

The median income for a household in the village was $27,438, and the median income for a family was $39,241. Males had a median income of $31,980 versus $24,656 for females. The per capita income for the village was $17,511. About 11.6% of families and 16.0% of the population were below the poverty line, including 26.5% of those under age 18 and 6.1% of those age 65 or over.

Oakdale Mall 

Opening in 1973, the Oakdale Mall, renamed to Oakdale Commons in 2022, located at Harry L. Drive and Reynolds Road in Johnson City, is a major indoor shopping destination for the Greater Binghamton area. Anchor stores have included JCPenney, Burlington Coat Factory, Sears, The Bon-Ton, and Montgomery Ward.

Library 
Your Home Library, founded in 1917, serves the village of Johnson City and the surrounding area.

The library building was originally the old Brigham homestead, erected by Elijah Brigham in 1850. The old farmhouse was of wooden construction but was later replaced by a much finer homestead. The new homestead was erected in 1885, and its foundations, walls, and partitions were constructed using brick from the Brigham Brick Yard, situated just north of the library building. The building was chosen by Harry L. Johnson and the Endicott Johnson Corporation as the site of the present library.

In 1920, a large addition was built and the children's room, dining rooms, and kitchen were removed to the new wing of the building. The library was owned, and entirely supported, by the Endicott Johnson Corporation until September 1921 when it was incorporated.

In 1938, the library building was purchased by the Village of Johnson City. It was listed on the National Register of Historic Places in 2005.

Schools

The K-8 Elementary, Intermediate, and Middle School is located just above the high school on 601 Columbia Drive; and the Johnson City High School is located on 666 Reynolds Road. The schools are operated by Johnson City Central School District.

Colleges 
Davis College is a private Baptist bible college in Johnson City.It  was founded in 1900 under the leadership of John Adelbert Davis.  The first location was on Harrison Street where Wilson Hospital now stands. The present site was bought in 1910 and the college moved to Riverside Drive in 1911. The college has about 329 students. Dorms are located on Riale Avenue and on Riverside Drive. It is in an EJ house neighborhood.

The Binghamton University health sciences campus is located on Corliss Ave, in the blocks bounded by Arch St, Broad St, and Willow St.

Notable people
 George F. Johnson, founded the Endicott Johnson Corporation here.
 Fred Coury, drummer for 80s hair-metal band Cinderella
 Jerry D'Amigo, professional ice hockey player for the Toronto Marlies, graduated from Johnson City High School in 2009.
 Jim Johnson, professional MLB player for the Atlanta Braves, was born here.
 DaQuan Jones, professional NFL player for the Buffalo Bills, graduated from Johnson City High School in 2010.
 David Sedaris, American humorist, comedian, author, and radio contributor.

References

External links

  Village of Johnson City official website
  Early history of Union and its communities
 Johnson City Central School District

Villages in New York (state)
New York (state) populated places on the Susquehanna River
Binghamton metropolitan area
Villages in Broome County, New York
Populated places established in 1892
Company towns in New York (state)
Ukrainian communities in the United States
1892 establishments in New York (state)